The following is a list of massacres that have occurred in Chile (numbers may be approximate):

References

Chile
Massacres
 
Massacres